Gestora de Inversiones Audiovisuales La Sexta, S.A. is a Spanish television production company that operates the Spanish terrestrial television channel laSexta.

Ownership
 51% GAMP (Grupo Audiovisual de Medios de Producción), made up of:
 69.95% Grupo Árbol-Globomedia (Emilio Aragón) and Mediapro
 9.8% Bilbao Bizkaia Kutxa (Basque bank)
 8.25% El Terrat (Andreu Buenafuente)
 12% Bainet (Karlos Arguiñano)
 40% Televisa (a Mexican media conglomerate)
 9% smaller investors such as Gala Capital George Soros

External links
 laSexta corporate website

Companies based in the Community of Madrid
Television production companies of Spain